Wrestling at the 1980 Summer Paralympics consisted of ten events for men.

Medal summary

References 

 

1980 Summer Paralympics events
1980
Paralympics